Nicole Steigenga (born 27 January 1998) is a Dutch racing cyclist, who currently rides for UCI Women's Continental Team .

Major results
2021
 1st  Rushes classification Tour Cycliste Féminin International de l'Ardèche
2022
 2nd Ronde de Mouscron
 2nd Leiedal Koerse
 7th Overall Bloeizone Fryslân Tour

References

External links
 

1998 births
Living people
Dutch female cyclists
People from Sneek
Cyclists from Friesland
21st-century Dutch women
20th-century Dutch women